Sânmihaiu or Sânmihai ("Saint Michael") may refer to several places in Romania:

Sânmihaiu Almașului, a commune in Sălaj County
Sânmihaiu de Câmpie, a commune in Bistrița-Năsăud County
Sânmihaiu Român, a commune in Timiș County, and its village of Sânmihaiu German
Sânmihai de Pădure, a village in Beica de Jos Commune, Mureș County
Sânmihaiu, the former name of Mihai Viteazu Commune, Cluj County